Wirtschaftsdienst – Zeitschrift für Wirtschaftspolitik is a peer-reviewed academic journal covering economic and social policy issues in Germany or affecting Germany. It also publishes topics of the European Union in the fields of trade, econometrics, environment, and monetary policy. The editor-in-chief is Jun.-Prof. Dr. Christian Breuer and it is published by Springer Science+Business Media. The journal is an official publication of the German National Library of Economics (ZBW). It was established in 1916 and is one of the oldest academic economics journals.

History
Wirtschaftsdienst was established in 1916 at the Hamburg Institute of International Economics (HWWA) in collaboration with the Kiel Institute for the World Economy and the University of Kiel. In 2007, the HWWA was merged with the ZBW with the aim of making the journal a leading forum for research-based discussions of major German and European economic policy issues.

See also
 Intereconomics

External links
 
 

Publications established in 1916
German economics journals
German-language journals
Springer Science+Business Media academic journals
Monthly journals